At 19:45 hrs on 13 March 2003, a bomb exploded as a train pulled into the Mulund railway station. The bomb was placed in the first class ladies' compartment and killed 10 people with 70 injured. Among the ten killed were four women in the first class compartment, two of which were police constables, and six men who were in the adjoining second class compartment. 

This was the third in a series of five bombings against the city within a period of eight months. The other bombings were:

 2002 Mumbai bus bombing
 January 2003 Mumbai bombing
 July 2003 Mumbai bombing
 August 2003 Mumbai bombings

Notes and references

External links
Blast in Mumbai train, 10 killed

 

21st-century mass murder in India
Mass murder in 2003
Train bombings in Asia
Improvised explosive device bombings in India
Terrorist incidents in Mumbai
Railway accidents in 2003
Railway accidents and incidents in Maharashtra
Terrorist incidents in India in 2003
Mumbai Suburban Railway
2000s in Mumbai
March 2003 events in India